Marchastel is the name of two communes in France:

 Marchastel, Cantal, in the Cantal department
 Marchastel, Lozère, in the Lozère department